Gordon Charles Hart (17 March 1919 – 16 April 2009) was an Australian World War II veteran and rugby league player who played in the 1930s and 1940s. He was a state representative  who won the 1941 premiership with St George.

Military career
Born at St Peters, New South Wales in 1919, Hart enlisted in the Australian Army Australian Army in August 1941. He attained the rank of Captain of the 2/4th Commando Squadron and was mentioned in dispatches for 'conspicuous bravery' during fighting on the island of Timor. He survived the war and was discharged in November 1945.

Rugby League career
Hart represented for New South Wales for one match in 1940.

After enlistment and before being posted for active service, he was given permission to leave camp to play in the 1941 Grand Final for St George. He traveled 28 hours from his Army Camp in Victoria to arrive in Sydney at 10am on the morning of the match. He scored a try and Haddan writes that Hart was "the Dragons' best back". He returned to base on the 8pm train that night.

Hart died on 16 April 2009, aged 90.

Published sources
 Whiticker, Alan & Hudson, Glen (2006) The Encyclopedia of Rugby League Players, Gavin Allen Publishing, Sydney
 Haddan, Steve (2007) The Finals - 100 Years of National Rugby League Finals, Steve Haddan Publishing, Brisbane

References

New South Wales rugby league team players
St. George Dragons players
1919 births
2009 deaths
Australian Army personnel of World War II
Rugby league centres
Rugby league players from Sydney
City New South Wales rugby league team players
Australian Army officers